Hörgertshausen is a municipality in the district of Freising in Bavaria in Germany.

History 

Pre-Christian Celtic graves shows that there has been settlement for a long time. But the first official mention of the village called "Herigoldshusa" (the house of Herigold) was in a donation of Emperor Arnulf of Carinthia to his vasal Earl Luitbold Cholo  in 899. In 1081 the possessions of Kuno II. of Rott were founded to the Cloister Rott while he fell in military service for Emperor Henry IV. From 1549 until the 19. century it was the so-called Hofmark by the Earls of Seyboltsdorf. In 1550, they built the Castle Hörgertshausen. In 1661, half of the village was destroyed by a blaze but also reconstructed in the same year. In 1848, Hörgertshausen became an autonomous municipality. In 1852, the Castle was destructed.  Since 1978, Hörgertshausen is part of the association of administrations Mauern, which consists of the municipalities of Hörgertshausen, Mauern, Gammelsdorf and Wang.

Main sights and culture

Sights 
Parish church St. Jacob the Elder, Hörgertshausen, crayoned by Christian Winck and varnished  by Roman Anton Boos in  1790/1791 
Parish church St. Margareth, Margarethenried
Pilgrimage Church St. Alban
Church St. Stephan, Sielstetten
Chapel Mary solace, Doidorf
„Albiganer Markt“ an annual small market and fair at Sankt Alban
 Town hall Hörgertshausen, distinguished with the Holzbaupreis 2007

Museum 
 Museum of local history Margarethenried-Hörgertshausen

Economy and infrastructure 

Farming and especially the cultivation of hops is the main appearance of the commune.
But there are also a lot of medium-sized enterprises and the German head office of the Italian GSI Group, which is a leading company in plastics technology and is supplying for e.g. Volkswagen and AGCO.

Mass transit 
Hörgertshausen can be reached a couple of times a day with the bus line 683 from Moosburg and Mainburg

Culture
Hörgertshausen is famous for its marching band which is leading the Riflemen at the annual Costume and Riflemen's Procession on the first Sunday in Munichs Oktoberfest.

Education 
 Elementary School Hörgertshausen

Notable people

 Johann Georg Graf von Seiboldsdorf (1628–1699), privy councillor, treasurer and governor of Lower Bavaria
 Prof. Dr. Philipp Fischer (* 1. Mai 1744; † 1. August 1800 in Ingolstadt), university professor at the University of Ingolstadt, medical attendant of Maximilian III Joseph, Elector of Bavaria, member of the Medical Society of Edinburgh (1776) 
 Daniela Pichlmaier, Hallertauer Queen of hops 2001/02

Honorary mayor 
 Lorenz Fischer, mayor of Hörgertshausen 1912–1937 (1937)

Honorary citizen 
 Anton Eichner, priest of congregation 1929–1952 (1950)
 Erich Soika, priest of congregation 1960–1985 (1980)

References

Freising (district)